Graham Moore (born October 18, 1981) is an American screenwriter, author  and director known for his 2010 novel The Sherlockian, as well as his screenplay for the historical film The Imitation Game, which topped the 2011 Black List for screenplays and won the 2014 Academy Award for Best Adapted Screenplay (awarded February 2015).

Early life and family
Moore was born in Chicago, Illinois and raised on the city's north side — "the son of two lawyers who divorced and then married two other lawyers."

Moore's father, Gary Moore, is an insurance defense attorney and his mother, Susan Sher (née Steiner), works for the University of Chicago. His mother was formerly the City of Chicago's chief lawyer and First Lady Michelle Obama's chief of staff. Moore's parents divorced when he was young.

Moore's stepfather is Cook County Circuit Court Judge Neil Cohen.

Raised Jewish, Moore graduated from the University of Chicago Laboratory Schools in 1999 and received a bachelor of arts degree in religious history in 2003 from Columbia University.

During his Academy Award acceptance speech in February 2015, Moore said that he had attempted suicide when he was 16.

Moore lives in Los Angeles, California.

Career

Moore began his writing career working with childhood friend Ben Epstein, who was attending Tisch School of the Arts in New York City. One of his earliest Hollywood jobs was on the writing staff of the short-lived television series 10 Things I Hate About You.

Moore's first book, The Sherlockian, was on the New York Times bestseller list for three weeks.

His adapted screenplay for the 2014 film The Imitation Game, based on the biography Alan Turing: The Enigma by Andrew Hodges, topped the 2011 Black List of the best unproduced scripts in Hollywood. The script earned Moore numerous nominations, including the 2014 Golden Globe Award for Best Screenplay, and ultimately won the 2014 Academy Award for Best Adapted Screenplay at the 87th Academy Awards (awarded February 2015).

Moore's second book, The Last Days of Night, was published by Random House on August 16, 2016. Set in 1888 New York City, the novel focuses on the heated rivalry between Thomas Edison and George Westinghouse during the advent of electricity and is told through the eyes of Westinghouse's attorney, Paul Cravath. Moore has adapted the screenplay for The Last Days of Night to be directed by Oscar-nominated director of The Imitation Game Morten Tyldum. Moore will write, direct, and produce the sci-fi thriller Naked Is the Best Disguise for Studio 8.

Moore's first film as director, The Outfit, premiered at the 72nd Berlin International Film Festival on February 14, 2022. It received positive reviews.

Novels
The Sherlockian (2010), published by Twelve 
The Last Days of Night (August 16, 2016), published by Penguin Random House 
The Holdout (February 18, 2020), published by Random House

Awards and nominations

References

External links

1981 births
Living people
21st-century American novelists
American male novelists
American male screenwriters
American audio engineers
American television writers
American mystery novelists
Best Adapted Screenplay Academy Award winners
Columbia College (New York) alumni
Jewish American writers
Writers Guild of America Award winners
Writers from Chicago
American male television writers
University of Chicago Laboratory Schools alumni
21st-century American male writers
Novelists from Illinois
Screenwriters from Illinois
Engineers from Illinois
21st-century American screenwriters
21st-century American Jews